Richard Newman may refer to:

Colonel Richard Newman (c. 1620–1695), English barrister and Royalist officer during the English Civil War
Sir Richard Newman, 1st Baronet (c. 1675–1721), English MP for Milborne Port in 1701
Richard Newman (English cricketer) (1756/57–1808), 18th-century English landowner, absentee landlord and cricketer
Richard Newman (priest) (1871–1961), Archdeacon of Blackburn, 1936–1946
Richard Newman (Australian cricketer) (1924–2014), Australian cricketer
Richard Newman (actor) (born 1946), American-Canadian voice actor
Richard P.A.C. Newman (1955–2000), British physicist
Richard Newman (poet) (born 1966), American poet
Richard Newman (broadcaster) (born 1972), British-Canadian writer and broadcaster, former Big Brother UK contestant
Richard G. Newman, chairman emeritus for AECOM
Richard S. Newman, American academic
Ricky Newman (born 1970), English footballer